Digital Poodle was an electro-industrial/EBM band, based in Toronto, Ontario, Canada. It was formed in 1986 and remained active until about 1995.

Background

Formed in 1986 by vocalist/programmer Heiki Sillaste (aka Mouth 392), the project was considered Toronto's answer to the established Vancouver-based industrial acts like Skinny Puppy, and Front Line Assembly. Digital Poodle's sound can be best described as house/techno mixed with European Electronic body music (EBM) and occasionally skirting experimental and ambient soundscapes. Sillaste's lyrical themes and choice of audio sampling typically covered the ending of the Cold War, as well as the following political independence struggles in the Baltic states and Eastern Europe.

Digital Poodle originally released a series of cassette tape demos and full release albums on Sillaste's own Shadow recording label. The first CD release was "Work Terminal" in 1992, which was distributed in North America under the Death of Vinyl label and in Europe on Germany's Hyperium Records label. The band's final release was the "Combat!" EP in 1997, which contained mainly remixed material from previous releases.

Other Digital Poodle studio members have included keyboardists Pupka Frey (of the band D.I.N.) and Reduct. Keyboard players Jean-Claude Cutz and Dave Rout were also associated with the band.  Post Digital Poodle, both joined a later configuration of Rational Youth.  Live shows of Digital Poodle featured the drummer/percussionists Kristian Helstrom and Andreas Gregor.

In 1995, Sillaste co-founded the Nice+Smooth Ultramedia label and has gone on to create 45 synthesizer-based albums and 120 compilation appearances. He has worked on other music projects in the genre of electronic dub, down beat, and house/techno music such as Kinder Atom and Lazer Caps, and is an accomplished graphic designer. He has also worked on music and sound for television shows such as CSI: Miami and commercials for Nissan.

On July 15th 2022, Digital Poodle reunited for a one-off performance as part of the Bombshelter Records' 35th anniversary event. Original members Heiki Sillaste, Kristian Helstrom, Andreas Gregor, and Dave Rout took part in a 5 song set. https://www.youtube.com/watch?v=Q4AQv0lsX8Q

Discography

Compilation appearances
 Instrumental CS - side B, track #5 "Uncivilized World" (Plan Eleven)
 Death of Vinyl CD - track #15 "Broadkast III" (DOVe, 1991)
 "Gárgula Mecânica" World Electrostatic Assembly CD - track #12 "Binary" (Simbiose, 1992)
 … To Hypersonic - The Hyperium Compilation Part II CD - track #8 "Free Men" (Hyperium, 1992)
 Hy! From Hypnotic To Hypersonic 2xCD - disc 2, track #8 "Free Men (Extended)" (Hyperium, 1992)
 Metro Tekno CD - track #1 "Work Terminal (U.S. Mix)" and track #2 "Free Men (Extended)" (Silent, 1992)
 Love Ta Love Ya Baby: An NMS '93 Dance Compilation LP - Side B, track #3 "Work Terminal" (New Music Seminar, 1993)
 Death of Vinyl Revolutions Vol. 1 CD - track #7 "Crack" and track #8 "Output Expander" (DOVe, 1993)
 Grid Slinger LP - side A, track #4 "Crack" (Re-constriction Records, Cleopatra 1993)
 Industrial Revolution - Second Edition 2xCD - disc 1, track #11 "Division" (Cleopatra, 1994) 
 Trance In Your Mind - The Unstoppable Trance Machine CD - track #4 "Crack (Free Base Mix)" (Cleopatra, 1994)
 Ambient Rituals Exercise One: Music For Soul Braiding CD - track #5 "Weapon" (Hyperium, 1995)
 Doom & Gloom/Visions of the Apocalypse CD - track #6 "Head of Lenin" (Kado, 1995)
 Enchantments CD - track #1 "Head of Lenin (Remix)" (Cleopatra, 1995)
 Industrial Revolution Second Edition VHS - "Work Terminal" video (Cleopatra, 1996)
 Nekrology CD - track #5 "Funkass" (Konsortium Produktions, 1996)
 Industrial Madness 4xCD - disc 3, track #5 "Red Star" (Cleopatra, 1997)
 Industrial Mix Machine 2xCD - disc 1, track #11 "Left/Right (Incarnate Mix)" (Cleopatra, 1997)
 Gothic Industrial Madness DVD - video "Work Terminal" (Cleopatra, 2000)
 Goth - The Ultimate Collection 2xDVD - disc 1, video "Work Terminal" (Cleopatra 2002)
 TDK 016 12" - side B, track #2, "Crack" (TdK, 2005)

References

External links
 Digital Poodle Discography at Discogs.com
 Heiki Sillaste's profile at Radio3
 Nice+Smooth Ultramedia - recording label and visual media company co-founded by Heiki Sillaste

Canadian industrial music groups
Musical groups established in 1986
Musical groups from Toronto
Musical groups disestablished in 1995
1986 establishments in Ontario
1995 disestablishments in Ontario